The German rescue swimming badge (German: Deutsches Rettungsschwimmabzeichen) is awarded by the Wasserwacht of the German Red Cross, the DLRG and the ASB for proficiency in rescue swimming skills. The German rescue swimming badge is awarded in bronze, silver, and in gold. 
The awards is available as a cloth patch, as a metal badge, or as a ribbon. 
The rescue swimming badges in silver and gold are permitted to be worn on uniforms of the Bundeswehr, the German Police and various rescue services as a ribbon.
It is also an entry-requirement for some German Police agencies.

History
In 1913 the DLRG offered its first rescue swimming classes. By the year 1922, 7997 rescue swimming certificates, 2038 badges in bronze, and 676 instructors' certificates were awarded.

Bronze

Requirements
 At least 12 years old
Test
 200 metres swim in less than 10 minutes, (100 m breaststroke and 100 m on the back without arm activity)
 100 metres swim in clothing in less than 4 minutes. Afterwards, taking off clothes in the water.
 Three different jumps from springboard of 1 metre height
 15 metres underwater swim on one breath
  Two 2–3 metres dives and retrieving a 5 kilo ring
 50 metres rescue pulling or pushing stroke
 50 metres lifesaving stroke
 Demonstrating proficiency in avoiding holds and chokes
 Demonstration of CPR
 Lifting a person out of the water
 Combination of:
 20 metre swim
 Diving and retrieving a 5 kilo ring
 20 metres rescue pulling stroke
 Demonstrating proficiency in (written test):
 Hazards near and inside water
 Respiratory and cardiovascular system
 Rescue for boat accidents or ice accidents
 First aid for near-drowning accidents
 Duties and responsibilities

Silver

Requirements
 At least 14 years old
 Completion of First-Aid course
Test
 400 metres swim (50 metres front crawl, 150 metres breaststroke, 200 metres pulling rescue stroke) in less than 15 minutes
 300 metres swim in clothing in less than 12 minutes. Afterwards, taking off clothes in the water.
 25 metres underwater swim on one breath
 Jump from springboard of 3 metres height
 Three 3–5 metres dives and retrieving a 5 kilo ring or a similar object
 50 metres rescue pushing stroke in 1:30 minutes
 Demonstrating proficiency in avoiding holds and chokes
 50 metres rescue pulling stroke in less than 4 minutes, both persons wearing clothes
 Combination of:
 20 metres swim
 Diving and retrieving a 5 kg ring in 3–5 metres depth
 Breaking a hold or choke
 Transporting a person 25 metres by using rescue pulling stroke
 Lifting a person out of the water
 Demonstrating CPR for three minutes
 Demonstrating proficiency in (written test):
 Hazards near and inside water
 Respiratory and cardiovascular system
 Rescue for boat accidents or ice accidents
 First aid for near-drowning accidents
 Duties and responsibilities
 Using rescue devices
 Duties and tasks of the lifeguard organization

Gold

Requirements
 At least 16 years old
 Completion of First-Aid course
 Completion of rescue swimming badge in silver
 Medical certificate of physical fitness (according to DLRG template # 15401353)
Test
 300 metres swim with swim fins in less than 6 minutes (250 metres swim in breaststroke or sidestroke, 50 metres pulling a partner wearing clothes with a hold on his head and axillary) 
 300 metres swim wearing clothes in less than 9 minutes. Afterwards, taking off clothes in water.
 100 metres swim in less than 1:40 minutes
 30 metres underwater swim on one breath while picking up at least 8 out of 10 rings from the ground across 20m within a variation of 2 m
 Three 3–5 metres dives wearing clothes and retrieving two 5 kilo rings or similar objects with 3 m in between in less than 3 minutes. The first time with a dive start. The second and third time from the water level, with a dive head first and a dive feet first.
 50 metres rescue pulling or pushing stroke with a partner in less than 1:30 minutes (both wearing clothes).
 Demonstrating proficiency in avoiding and breaking holds and chokes
Combination of:
 25 metres swim in less than 30 seconds
 Diving and retrieving a 5 kg ring in 3–5 metres depth
 Breaking a hold or choke
 Transport person 25 metres by using rescue pulling stroke in less than 60 seconds
 Lifting person out of the water
 Demonstrating CPR for three minutes
 Demonstrating proficiency in using rescue aids:
 How to use a throw bag with rope
 How to use a throw ball with rope (very similar to a throw bag)
 Devices for CPR

Exam
 Demonstrating proficiency in (written test):
 Methods of cardiopulmonary resuscitation
 Avoiding holds and chokes
 First aid
 Duties and tasks of the lifeguard organization (DLRG)

See also 
German Sports Badge

References 
 Rettungsschwimmabzeichen der DLRG (in German)
 Rettungsschwimmabzeichen der Wasserwacht im DRK (in German)

Wasserrettung im ASB (in German)
Awards established in 1913
1913 establishments in Germany
rescue swimming